"Jóga" is a song recorded by Icelandic singer, songwriter and actress Björk for her third studio album, Homogenic (1997). An electronica song, "Jóga" fuses these elements with baroque and classical styles. The track's sound was partially inspired by Icelandic music, containing what have been described as "volcanic beats". Lyrically, the piece is an ode to Björk's native land and her best friend, while containing subtexts relating to the state of emergency.

"Jóga" was released as the lead single from Homogenic on 15 September 1997 to critical acclaim, with reviewers praising her powerful vocal performance, as well as the track's composition and overall production. Commercially, the song was a moderate success, but peaked at number one in Björk's native Iceland.

Recording and production

Like most of Homogenic, "Jóga" was recorded and produced at El Cortijo in Málaga, Spain. Björk wrote the song while walking and admiring the landscape, a common way for her to write songs since childhood.

She explained "an overall picture" of it to engineer Markus Dravs, who then came out with a rhythm that she felt was "too abstract". Mark Bell, the producer of the track, then came and "took 99 percent of what [he] did and came up with some noises", giving Dravs new ideas. Björk wrote the string arrangements, which were provided late in the production process by the Icelandic String Octet.

Music and lyrics
"Jóga" is dedicated to—and named after—Björk's best friend, Jóhanna "Jóga" Johannsdóttir (the wife of former Mayor of Reykjavík Jón Gnarr), whom Björk would usually thank in her album credits. The song is also a dedication to her native Iceland, an example of Björk's desire to have a conceptual focus on the country for Homogenic. Referring to this concept, she told OOR: "The electronic beats are the rhythm, the heartbeat. The violins create the old fashioned atmosphere, the colouring." "Jóga" has been described as "the real conceptual heart of the record" and "a sonic picture of the geographical beauty of her homeland". The track showcases these hybrid elements of strings and electronic backing beats through the album, thus being described as "baroque electronica" by Slant Magazine'''s Sal Cinquemani.

The strong beats—referred to as "volcanic"—reflect Iceland's primal and chaotic nature. Due to its harsh beats and halfway drop, some modern critics have described the track as "proto dubstep". "Jóga" is a love song; its lyrics were written by poet Sjón, Björk's friend and collaborator. Björk explained her inability to write the song's lyrics in an interview with MuchMusic: "I tried to write that tune but, I mean, I just wanted mainly to write lyrics. It was just pathetic. I was like 'her... her...'  it was like 'love... love...' I couldn't even put it into words. So, you know, it's—yeah, it's probably the—I think it's the fiercest love song I have written, I think." She sings about the beauty of being in a "state of emergency", and thanks someone for pushing her into it.

 Critical reception 
"Jóga" has received acclaim from music critics ever since its release. Heather Phares of AllMusic wrote that "Björk lets a little light shine through "Jóga"" and described it as a "moving song", listing it as one of the album highlights. Furthermore, Sal Cinquemani of Slant Magazine labelled the track "adrenaline".

David Browne of Entertainment Weekly also commented on "Jóga", writing that it was more "somber" than another single from Homogenic, "Bachelorette", and Björk sings the lyrics with "the strings swelling luxuriantly". Robert Christgau, in his review for the album, placed it as one of the recommended tracks alongside "Bachelorette". British magazine Music Week rated it five out of five, picking it as Single of the Week. They described it as "a real beauty, with Björk's voice allowed to shine above spooky beats and lush strings."

In Slant Magazine''s list "The 100 Best Singles of the 1990s", "Jóga" was placed at number 35; alongside the ranking, the track was praised, said to contain "one of the Icelandic singer-songwriter's fiercest vocal performances to date", as well as that the "sweeping string arrangement is its true star".

Commercial performance 
"Jóga" was a commercial success in Björk's native Iceland, peaking atop the Íslenski Listinn Top 40 the week of 23–30 October 1997. Elsewhere, the song was moderately successful, peaking within the top 20 in Finland and the top 40 in Sweden.

While all of Björk's first 11 singles reached the top 40 of the UK Singles Chart, including three top-ten singles from Post (1995), "Jóga" was ruled ineligible to chart since it was released solely as a three-CD and VHS box set (as well as individual releases of the formats). Despite Björk's record label One Little Indian attempting to convince the Official Charts Company (OCC) that the VHS was bundled for free, "Jóga" remained barred from the chart as its release exceeded the chart's three-format limit. However, the song managed to enter the chart months after its release, peaking at number 191 on the chart dated 28 February 1998.

Music video

The music video was directed by Michel Gondry and filmed in Iceland.

The video for "Jóga" is a departure from her other videos as it features a simple concept of focusing primarily on different Icelandic terrains and landscapes with Björk's presence only in the beginning and towards the end. With the aid of computer animation, earthquakes begin to separate and shift the chunks of land along fault lines. The video ends with a computerised image of an island floating inside Björk's chest.

Track listing

Charts

Release history

Notes

References

External links
List of "Jóga" releases
Jóga webpage

1997 singles
1997 songs
Björk songs
Electronica songs
Music videos directed by Michel Gondry
One Little Indian Records singles
Song recordings produced by Björk
Songs with lyrics by Sjón
Songs written by Björk
Patriotic songs
Baroque pop songs
Number-one singles in Iceland
Songs about friendship
Music videos shot in Iceland